The American Club Taipei, formerly known as the American Club in China ("ACC"), is a private member-owned club that serves the international community in the Greater Taipei area. The ACC is located in Zhongshan District, Taipei.

History 

Founded in 1968, the ACC is located on the premises of what was the MAAG NCO Open Mess - Club 63, a US enlisted personnel club for MAAG NCOs established in 1957. In the mid-1970s Club 63 was transferred to the U.S. Navy and renamed as the China Seas Club. With the withdrawal of the U.S. military from the island, the China Seas Club ceased operation and was re-purposed as a private club for the U.S. expatriate business community in Taipei, becoming the ACC.

Membership & Benefits 

Despite its name, ACC membership is open to people of all nationalities. The club’s current membership includes people from over 40 countries. The majority of its members however are U.S. and Taiwanese (R.O.C) citizens.

All ACC members enjoy full use of the club's facilities, including a swimming pool, fitness center, squash and tennis courts, nursery, library, and hair salon. The ACC also features a number of restaurants, including the Terrace (Coffee shop), Sigis (Italian), Gyoson (Japanese) and Rendezvous (Sports bar). The ACC has reciprocal agreements with over 80 clubs from around the world.

See also 

 Former American Club in Shanghai
American Club Beijing
American Club Shanghai
 American Club Hong Kong
 Tokyo American Club
American Club Singapore
Taipei American School
American Institute  in Taiwan (AIT)

References

Organizations based in Taipei
American expatriate organizations